Chlorproguanil is an antimalarial drug.

References

See also
 Proguanil
 Chlorproguanil hydrochloride-dapsone-artesunate

Antimalarial agents
Biguanides
Chloroarenes